The IRE unit is used in the measurement of composite video signals. Its name is derived from the initials of the Institute of Radio Engineers.

A value of 100 IRE is defined to be +714 mV in an analog NTSC video signal. A value of 0 IRE corresponds to the voltage value of 0 mV, the signal value during the blanking period. The sync pulse is normally 40 IRE below this 0 IRE value, so the total range covered from peak to trough of an all white signal would be 140 IRE.

Video signals use the "IRE" unit instead of DC voltages to describe levels and amplitudes. Based on a standard 1 Vpp NTSC composite-video signal that swings from -286 mV (sync tip) to +714 mV (peak video), a 140 IRE peak-to-peak convention is established. Thus, one NTSC IRE unit is 7.143 mV ( V or  mV), where -40 IRE is equivalent to -285.7 mV, and +100 IRE is equivalent to +714.3 mV. 0 IRE is equivalent to 0 V. The black level is equivalent to 53.57 mV (7.5 IRE).

The PAL video signal is slightly different in that it swings from -300 mV to +700 mV, instead. Thus, one PAL IRE unit is 7 mV, where -43 IRE is equivalent to -300 mV at the sync tip, and +100 IRE is equivalent to +700 mV at the peak video level. Black level is the same as the blanking level 0 mV (0 IRE).

The reason IRE is a relative measurement (percent) is because a video signal may be any amplitude. This unit is used in the ITU-R BT.470 which defines PAL, NTSC and SECAM:

References

Units of measurement
Broadcast engineering
Video formats
Television technology
ITU-R recommendations